Format of entries is:
 ICAO (IATA) – Airport Name – Airport Location

RC – Taiwan 

 RCAY – Gangshan Airport – Kaohsiung City
 RCBS (KNH) – Kinmen Airport – Kinmen
 RCCM (CMJ) – Cimei Airport – Penghu
 RCDI – Longtan Army Heliport – Taoyuan City
 RCFG (LZN) – Matsu Nangan Airport – Nangan, Lienchiang
 RCFN (TTT) – Taitung Airport – Taitung
 RCGI (GNI) – Lüdao Airport – Taitung
 RCGM – Taoyuan Air Base (defunct) – Taoyuan City
 RCKH (KHH) – Kaohsiung International Airport (Siaogang Airport) – Kaohsiung City
 RCKU (CYI) – Chiayi Airport (Shueishang Airport) – Chiayi
 RCKW (HCN) – Hengchun Airport (possibly defunct) – Pingtung
 RCLM (DSX) – Dongsha Airport – Pratas Island
 RCLY (KYD) – Lanyu Airport – Taitung
 RCMQ (RMQ) – Taichung International Airport – Taichung
 RCMT (MFK) – Matsu Beigan Airport – Beigan, Lienchiang
 RCNN (TNN) – Tainan Airport – Tainan City
 RCPO (HSZ) – Hsinchu Airport – Hsinchu
 RCQC (MZG) – Penghu Airport – Penghu
 RCSP – Taiping Island Airport – Taiping Island
 RCSQ (PIF) – Pingtung Airport – Pingtung
 RCSS (TSA) – Taipei Songshan Airport – Taipei City
 RCTP (TPE) – Taiwan Taoyuan International Airport – Taoyuan City
 RCWA (WOT) – Wang-an Airport – Penghu
 RCYU (HUN) – Hualien Airport – Hualien

RJ RO – Japan

RJ 
 RJAA (NRT) – Narita International Airport – Narita, Chiba
 RJAF (MMJ) – Matsumoto Airport – Matsumoto, Nagano
 RJAH (IBR) – Ibaraki Airport (Hyakuri Airfield) – Omitama, Ibaraki
 RJAK – Kasumigaura Air Field – Kasumigaura, Ibaraki
 RJAM (MUS) – Minami Torishima Airport – Minamitorishima, Tokyo
 RJAN – Niijima Airport – Niijima, Tokyo
 RJAW (IWO) – Central Field (Iwo Jima Air Base) – Ogasawara, Tokyo
 RJAZ – Kōzushima Airport – Kōzushima, Tokyo
 RJBB (KIX) – Kansai International Airport – Izumisano, Tajiri, Sennan, Osaka
 RJBD (SHM) – Nanki-Shirahama Airport – Shirahama, Wakayama
 RJBE (UKB) – Kobe Airport – Kobe, Hyōgo
 RJBH (HIW) – Hiroshima-Nishi Airport – Hiroshima, Hiroshima
 RJBK (OKS) – Kōnan Airport (Kounan) – Okayama, Okayama
 RJBM – Maizuru Heliport – Maizuru, Kyoto
 RJBT (TJH) – Tajima Airport – Toyooka, Hyōgo
 RJCA – Asahikawa Air Field – Asahikawa, Hokkaidō
 RJCB (OBO) – Tokachi-Obihiro Airport (Obihiro) – Obihiro, Hokkaidō
 RJCC (CTS) – New Chitose Airport – Chitose, Hokkaidō
 RJCH (HKD) – Hakodate Airport – Hakodate, Hokkaidō
 RJCJ – Chitose Air Base – Chitose, Hokkaidō
 RJCK (KUH) – Kushiro Airport – Kushiro, Hokkaidō
 RJCM (MMB) – Memanbetsu Airport – Memanbetsu, Hokkaidō
 RJCN (SHB) – Nakashibetsu Airport – Nakashibetsu, Hokkaidō
 RJCO (OKD) – Okadama Airport (Sapporo Okadama) – Sapporo, Hokkaidō
 RJCR (RBJ) – Rebun Airport (closed) – Rebun, Hokkaidō
 RJCT – Tokachi Airfield (formerly Obihiro Airport) – Obihiro, Hokkaidō
 RJCW (WKJ) – Wakkanai Airport – Wakkanai, Hokkaidō
 RJDA – Amakusa Airfield – Amakusa, Kumamoto
 RJDB (IKI) – Iki Airport – Iki, Nagasaki
 RJDC (UBJ) – Yamaguchi Ube Airport – Ube, Yamaguchi
 RJDK – Kamigoto Airport – Shinkamigoto, Nagasaki
 RJDM – Metabaru Air Field – Kamimine, Saga
 RJDO – Ojika Airport (Nagasaki Ojika) – Ojika, Nagasaki
 RJDT (TSJ) – Tsushima Airport – Tsushima, Nagasaki
 RJEB (MBE) – Monbetsu Airport (Okhotsk-Monbetsu) – Monbetsu, Hokkaidō
 RJEC (AKJ) – Asahikawa Airport – Asahikawa, Hokkaidō
 RJEO (OIR) – Okushiri Airport – Okushiri, Hokkaidō
 RJER (RIS) – Rishiri Airport – Rishirifuji, Hokkaidō
 RJFA – Ashiya Air Field – Ashiya, Fukuoka
 RJFC (KUM) – Yakushima Airport – Yakushima, Kagoshima
 RJFE (FUJ) – Fukue Airport – Gotō, Fukue, Nagasaki
 RJFF (FUK) – Fukuoka Airport – Fukuoka, Fukuoka
 RJFG (TNE) – New Tanegashima Airport – Tanegashima, Kagoshima
 RJFK (KOJ) – Kagoshima Airport – Kirishima, Kagoshima
 RJFM (KMI) – Miyazaki Airport – Miyazaki, Miyazaki
 RJFN – Nyutabaru Air Base – Shintomi, Miyazaki
 RJFO (OIT) – Oita Airport – Kunisaki, Ōita
 RJFR (KKJ) – Kitakyūshū Airport (Kokuraminami Airport) – Kitakyūshū, Fukuoka
 RJFS (HSG) – Saga Airport (Kyushu Saga International Airport) – Kawasoe, Saga
 RJFT (KMJ) – Kumamoto Airport – Mashiki, Kumamoto
 RJFU (NGS) – Nagasaki Airport – Ōmura, Nagasaki
 RJFY – Kanoya Air Field – Kanoya, Kagoshima
 RJFZ – Tsuiki Air Field – Tsuiki, Fukuoka
 RJGG (NGO) – Chūbu Centrair International Airport (Centrair) – Tokoname, Aichi
 RJKA (ASJ) – Amami Airport – Amami, Kagoshima
 RJKB (OKE) – Okinoerabu Airport – Wadomari, Kagoshima
 RJKI (KKX) – Kikai Airport (Kikaijima Airport/Kikaiga Shima Airport) – Kikai, Kagoshima
 RJKN (TKN) – Tokunoshima Airport – Tokunoshima, Kagoshima
 RJNA (NKM) – Nagoya Airfield/Komaki Air Base – Nagoya, Aichi
 RJNF (FKJ) – Fukui Airport – Harue, Fukui
 RJNG – Gifu Air Field – Gifu, Gifu
 RJNH – Hamamatsu Air Base – Hamamatsu, Shizuoka
 RJNK (KMQ) – Komatsu Airport – Komatsu, Ishikawa
 RJNO (OKI) – Oki Airport – Okinoshima, Shimane
 RJNS (FSZ) – Shizuoka Airport (Mt. Fuji Shizuoka Airport) – Makinohara, Shimada, Shizuoka
 RJNT (TOY) – Toyama Airport – Toyama, Toyama
 RJNW (NTQ) – Noto Airport (Noto Satoyama Airport) – Wajima, Ishikawa
 RJNY – Shizuhama Air Base – Yaizu, Shizuoka
 RJOA (HIJ) – Hiroshima Airport – Mihara, Hiroshima
 RJOB (OKJ) – Okayama Airport (Okayama Momotaro Airport) – Okayama, Okayama
 RJOC (IZO) – Izumo Airport – Hikawa, Shimane
 RJOE – Akeno Air Field – Ise, Mie
 RJOF – Hōfu Air Field – Hōfu, Yamaguchi
 RJOH (YGJ) – Miho-Yonago Airport – Yonago, Tottori
 RJOI (IWK) – MCAS Iwakuni (Iwakuni Kintaikyo Airport) – Iwakuni, Yamaguchi
 RJOK (KCZ) – Kōchi Airport (Kōchi Ryōma Airport) – Nankoku, Kōchi
 RJOM (MYJ) – Matsuyama Airport – Matsuyama, Ehime
 RJOO (ITM) – Osaka International Airport (Itami Airport) – Toyonaka, Ikeda, Osaka, Itami, Hyōgo
 RJOP – Komatsushima Heliport – Komatsushima, Tokushima
 RJOR (TTJ) – Tottori Airport – Tottori, Tottori
 RJOS (TKS) – Tokushima Airport (Tokushima Awaodori Airport) – Matsushige, Tokushima
 RJOT (TAK) – Takamatsu Airport – Takamatsu, Kagawa
 RJOW (IWJ) – Iwami Airport (Hagi-Iwami Airport) – Masuda, Shimane
 RJOY – Yao Airport – Yao, Osaka
 RJOZ – Ozuki Air Field – Shimonoseki, Yamaguchi
 RJSA (AOJ) – Aomori Airport – Aomori, Aomori
 RJSC (GAJ) – Yamagata Airport – Higashine, Yamagata
 RJSD (SDS) – Sado Airport – Sado, Niigata
 RJSF (FKS) – Fukushima Airport – Tamakawa, Fukushima
 RJSH – Hachinohe Air Base – Hachinohe, Aomori
 RJSI (HNA) – Hanamaki Airport (Moriota Hanamaki Airport/Iwate-Hanamki Airport) – Hanamaki, Iwate
 RJSK (AXT) – Akita Airport – Akita, Akita
 RJSM (MSJ) – Misawa Airport/Misawa Air Base – Misawa, Aomori
 RJSN (KIJ) – Niigata Airport – Niigata, Niigata
 RJSO – Ōminato Air Field – Mutsu, Aomori
 RJSR (ONJ) – Odate-Noshiro Airport – Kitaakita, Akita
 RJSS (SDJ) – Sendai Airport – Natori, Miyagi
 RJST – Matsushima Air Field – Matsushima, Miyagi
 RJSU – Kasuminome Air Field – Sendai, Miyagi
 RJSY (SYO) – Shonai Airport – Sakata, Yamagata
 RJTA (NJA) – NAF Atsugi – Ayase, Kanagawa
 RJTC – Tachikawa Airfield – Tachikawa, Tokyo
 RJTE – Tateyama Air Field – Tateyama, Chiba
 RJTF – Chofu Airport – Chōfu, Tokyo
 RJTH (HAC) – Hachijojima Airport – Hachijō, Tokyo
 RJTI – Tokyo Heliport – Kōtō, Tokyo
 RJTJ – Iruma Air Base – Iruma, Saitama
 RJTK – Kisarazu Air Field – Kisarazu, Chiba
 RJTL – Shimofusa Air Base – Shimofusa, Chiba
 RJTO (OIM) – Oshima Airport – Izu Ōshima, Tokyo
 RJTQ (MYE) – Miyakejima Airport – Miyakejima, Tokyo
 RJTR – Camp Zama Kastner Army Heliport – Zama, Kanagawa
 RJTS – Soumagahara Heliport – Maebashi, Gunma
 RJTT (HND) – Tokyo International Airport (Haneda) – Ōta, Tokyo
 RJTU – Utsunomiya Air Field – Utsunomiya, Tochigi
 RJTY (OKO) – Yokota Air Base – Fussa, Tokyo

RO 
 ROAH (OKA) – Naha Airport/Naha Air Base – Naha, Okinawa
 RODN (DNA) – Kadena Air Base – Okinawa, Okinawa
 ROIG (ISG) – New Ishigaki Airport (Painushima Ishigaki Airport; formerly Ishigaki Airport) – Ishigaki, Okinawa
 ROIT – Oitakenou Airport – Bungo-ōno, Ōita
 ROKJ (UEO) – Kumejima Airport – Kumejima, Okinawa
 ROKR (KJP) – Kerama Airport – Zamami, Okinawa
 ROMD (MMD) – Minami-Daito Airport (New Minamidaito) – Minamidaitō, Okinawa
 ROMY (MMY) – Miyako Airport – Miyakojima, Okinawa
 RORA (AGJ) – Aguni Airport – Aguni, Okinawa
 RORE (IEJ) – Iejima Airport – Ie, Okinawa
 RORH (HTR) – Hateruma Airport – Taketomi, Okinawa
 RORK (KTD) – Kitadaito Airport – Kitadaito, Okinawa
 RORS (SHI) – Shimojishima Airport – Miyakojima, Okinawa
 RORT (TRA) – Tarama Airport – Tarama, Okinawa
 RORY (RNJ) – Yoron Airport – Yoron, Kagoshima
 ROTM – Marine Corps Air Station Futenma – Ginowan, Okinawa
 ROYN (OGN) – Yonaguni Airport – Yonaguni, Okinawa

RK – South Korea 

 RKDD – Dokdo Heliport – (Dokdo) (Ulleung)
 RKJB (MWX) – Muan International Airport – Muan
 RKJJ (KWJ) – Gwangju Airport – Gwangju
 RKJK (KUV) – Gunsan Airport / Kunsan Air Base – Gunsan
 RKJM (MPK) – Mokpo Air Base – Yeongam County (near Mokpo)
 RKJU (CHN) – Jeonju Airport (military) – Jeonju
 RKJY (RSU) – Yeosu Airport – Yeosu
 RKND (SHO) – Sokcho Air Base (Civil airport closed in favour of Yangyang International Airport) – Sokcho
 RKNN (KAG) – Gangneung Air Base – Gangneung
 RKNW (WJU) – Wonju Airport – Wonju
 RKNY (YNY) – Yangyang International Airport – Yangyang County
 RKPC (CJU) – Jeju International Airport – Jeju
 RKPD (JDG) – Jeongseok Airport (Jungseok Airport) – Seogwipo (Jeju Province)
 RKPE (CHF) – Jinhae Air Base – Jinhae
 RKPK (PUS) – Gimhae International Airport – Busan
 RKPS (HIN) – Sacheon Airport – Sacheon
 RKPU (USN) – Ulsan Airport – Ulsan
 RKRS – Susaek Air Base – Goyang
 RKSG – Camp Humphreys – Pyeongtaek
 RKSI (ICN) – Incheon International Airport – Incheon (near Seoul)
 RKSM (SSN) – Seoul Airbase – Seongnam
 RKSO (OSN) – Osan Air Base – Osan
 RKSS (GMP) – Gimpo International Airport – Seoul
 RKSW (SWU) – Suwon Air Base - Suwon
 RKTA – Hanseo University Taean Airfield - Taean
 RKTE – Seongmu Air Base – Cheongju
 RKTH (KPO) – Pohang Airport – Pohang
 RKTI (JWO) – Jungwon Air Base – Chungju
 RKTL (UJN) – Uljin Airfield – Uljin
 RKTN (TAE) – Daegu International Airport – Daegu
 RKTP (HMY) – Seosan Air Base – Seosan
 RKTU (CJJ) – Cheongju International Airport – Cheongju
 RKTY (YEC) – Yecheon Air Base – Yecheon

RP – Philippines 

NOTE: Under the prevailing ICAO code assignment scheme, airports in the Luzon island group (including the Cuyo Islands, but excluding Masbate, Romblon and the rest of Palawan) and the Caluya islands of Antique are assigned RPLx and RPUx codes; those in the Visayas (except Caluya), Masbate, Romblon and Palawan (excluding Cuyo), RPVx and RPSx; and those in Mindanao, RPMx and RPNx. 

 RPLA – Pinamalayan Airport – Pinamalayan, Oriental Mindoro
 RPLB (SFS) – Subic Bay International Airport – Subic Bay Freeport Zone, Morong, Bataan
 RPLC (CRK) – Clark International Airport/Clark Air Base (military) – Clark Freeport Zone, Mabalacat, Pampanga
 RPLE – Balesin Airport (E.L. Tordesillas Airport) – Polillo, Quezon
 RPLG – Wasig Airport (possibly defunct) – Mansalay, Oriental Mindoro
 RPLH (LLC) – Cagayan North International Airport – Lal-lo, Cagayan
 RPLI (LAO) – Laoag International Airport – Laoag, Ilocos Norte
 RPLJ – Jomalig Island Airport – Jomalig, Quezon
 RPLK (DRP) – Bicol International Airport – Daraga, Albay
 RPLL (MNL) – Ninoy Aquino (Manila) International Airport/Villamor Air Base (military) – Metro Manila
 RPLN – Palanan Airport – Palanan, Isabela
 RPLO (CYU) – Cuyo Airport – Cuyo, Palawan
 RPLQ – Ernesto Rabina Air Base (military) – Capas, Tarlac
 RPLR – Rosales Airport – Rosales, Pangasinan
 RPLS (SGL) – Danilo Atienza Air Base (military) (formerly U.S. Naval Station Sangley Point) – Cavite City, Cavite
 RPLT – Itbayat Airport (Jorge Abad Airport) – Itbayat, Batanes
 RPLU (LBX) – Lubang Airport – Lubang, Occidental Mindoro
 RPLV – Fort Magsaysay Airfield (military) – Palayan, Nueva Ecija
 RPLW – Wallace Drone Launch Facility – San Fernando, La Union
 RPLX – Kindley Landing Field, Corregidor – Cavite City, Cavite
 RPLY – Alabat Airport – Perez, Quezon
 RPLZ – Sorsogon (Bacon) Airport – Sorsogon City, Sorsogon
 RPMA (AAV) – Allah Valley Airport – Surallah, South Cotabato
 RPMB – Rajah Buayan Air Base (military) – General Santos (formerly assigned to U.S. Naval Air Station Cubi Point, now RPLB - Subic Bay International Airport)
 RPMC (CBO) – Cotabato Airport (Awang Airport) – Datu Odin Sinsuat, Maguindanao (formerly assigned to Cebu–Lahug Airport, now closed)
 RPMD (DVO) – Francisco Bangoy International Airport – Davao City
 RPME (BXU) – Bancasi Airport (Butuan Airport) – Butuan
 RPMF (BPH) – Bislig Airport – Bislig, Surigao del Sur
 RPMG (DPL) – Dipolog Airport – Dipolog, Zamboanga del Norte
 RPMH (CGM) – Camiguin Airport – Mambajao, Camiguin
 RPMI (IGN) – Maria Cristina Airport (Iligan Airport) – Baloi, Lanao del Norte
 RPMJ (JOL) – Jolo Airport – Jolo, Sulu
 RPMK – Kenram Airport – Isulan, Sultan Kudarat (formerly assigned to Clark Air Base, now RPLC)
 RPML – Lumbia Airfield (military) – Cagayan de Oro (formerly assigned to Laoag International Airport, now RPLI)
 RPMM (MLP) – Malabang Airport – Malabang, Lanao del Sur (formerly assigned to Ninoy Aquino (Manila) International Airport, now RPLL)
 RPMN (TWT) – Sanga-Sanga Airport (Tawi-Tawi Airport) – Bongao, Tawi-Tawi
 RPMO (OZC) – Labo Airport (Ozamiz Airport) – Ozamiz, Misamis Occidental
 RPMP (PAG) – Pagadian Airport – Pagadian, Zamboanga del Sur (formerly assigned to Legazpi Airport, now RPLP)
 RPMQ (MXI) – Mati Airport – Mati, Davao Oriental
 RPMR (GES) – General Santos International Airport (Tambler Airport) – General Santos (formerly assigned to a weather station on Romblon Island)
 RPMS (SUG) – Surigao Airport – Surigao City, Surigao del Norte (formerly assigned to U.S. Naval Station Sangley Point, now RPLS - Atienza Air Base)
 RPMT – Del Monte Plantation Airstrip – Manolo Fortich, Bukidnon (formerly assigned to Mactan Air Base, now part of RPVM - Mactan–Cebu International Airport)
 RPMU – Cagayan de Sulu Airport – Mapun, Tawi-Tawi
 RPMV (IPE) – Ipil Airport – Ipil, Zamboanga Sibugay
 RPMW (TDG) – Tandag Airport – Tandag, Surigao del Sur
 RPMX – Liloy Airport – Liloy, Zamboanga del Norte
 RPMY (CGY) – Laguindingan International Airport – Laguindingan, Misamis Oriental (formerly assigned to Malaybalay Airport, now closed)
 RPMZ (ZAM) – Zamboanga International Airport – Zamboanga City
 RPNO (XSO) – Siocon Airport – Siocon, Zamboanga del Norte
 RPNS (IAO) – Sayak Airport (Siargao Airport) – Del Carmen, Surigao del Norte
 RPSB – Bantayan Airport – Santa Fe, Cebu
 RPSD (RZP) – Taytay Airport (Cesar Lim Rodriguez/Sandoval Airport) – Taytay, Palawan
 RPSG (ICO) – Sicogon Airport – Carles, Iloilo
 RPSM – Panan-awan Airport (Maasin Airport) – Maasin, Southern Leyte
 RPSN – Ubay Airport – Ubay, Bohol
 RPSP (TAG) – Bohol-Panglao International Airport (New Bohol International Airport) – Panglao Island, Bohol
 RPSV (SWL) – San Vicente Airport – San Vicente, Palawan
 RPUA – Pamalican (Amanpulo) Airport – Agutaya, Palawan (formerly assigned to Maura Airport in Aparri, Cagayan)
 RPUB (BAG) – Loakan Airport – Baguio
 RPUC – Cabanatuan (Maniquis) Airfield (defunct) – Cabanatuan, Nueva Ecija
 RPUD (DTE) – Bagasbas Airport (Daet Airport) – Daet, Camarines Norte
 RPUE – Semirara Airstrip – Caluya, Antique (formerly assigned to Lucena Airport in Lucena)
 RPUF – Cesar Basa Air Base (military) – Floridablanca, Pampanga
 RPUG – Lingayen Airport – Lingayen, Pangasinan
 RPUH (SJI) – San Jose Airport – San Jose, Occidental Mindoro
 RPUI – Iba Airport – Iba, Zambales
 RPUJ – Castillejos (Jesus Magsaysay) Airfield – Castillejos, Zambales
 RPUK – Calapan Airport – Calapan, Oriental Mindoro
 RPUL – Basilio Fernando Air Base (military) – Lipa, Batangas
 RPUM (MBO) – Mamburao Airport – Mamburao, Occidental Mindoro
 RPUN (WNP) – Naga Airport – Pili, Camarines Sur
 RPUO (BSO) – Basco Airport – Basco, Batanes
 RPUP – Jose Panganiban (Larap) Airport – Jose Panganiban, Camarines Norte
 RPUQ – Mindoro Airport (Vigan Airport) – Vigan, Ilocos Sur
 RPUR (BQA) – Baler Airport (Dr. Juan C. Angara Airport) – Baler, Aurora
 RPUS (SFE) – San Fernando Airport – San Fernando, La Union
 RPUT (TUG) – Tuguegarao Airport – Tuguegarao, Cagayan
 RPUU – Bulan Airport – Bulan, Sorsogon
 RPUV (VRC) – Virac Airport – Virac, Catanduanes
 RPUW (MRQ) – Marinduque Airport – Gasan, Marinduque
 RPUX – Plaridel Airport – Plaridel, Bulacan
 RPUY (CYZ) – Cauayan Airport – Cauayan, Isabela
 RPUZ – Bagabag Airport – Bagabag, Nueva Vizcaya
 RPVA (TAC) – Tacloban City Airport (Daniel Z. Romualdez Airport) – Tacloban
 RPVB (BCD) – Bacolod–Silay International Airport – Silay, Negros Occidental
 RPVC (CYP) – Calbayog Airport – Calbayog, Samar
 RPVD (DGT) – Dumaguete-Sibulan Airport – Sibulan, Negros Oriental
 RPVE (MPH) – Caticlan Airport (Godofredo P. Ramos/Boracay Airport) – Malay, Aklan
 RPVF (CRM) – Catarman National Airport – Catarman, Northern Samar
 RPVG – Guiuan Airport – Guiuan, Eastern Samar
 RPVH (HIL) – Hilongos Airport – Hilongos, Leyte
 RPVI (ILO) – Iloilo International Airport (Cabatuan Airport) – Cabatuan, Iloilo
 RPVJ (MBT) – Moises R. Espinosa Airport (Masbate Airport) – Masbate City, Masbate
 RPVK (KLO) – Kalibo International Airport – Kalibo, Aklan
 RPVL – Del Pilar Airport – Roxas, Palawan  (formerly assigned to Wasig Airport, now RPLG)
 RPVM (CEB) – Mactan–Cebu International Airport – Lapu-Lapu
 RPVN – Medellin Airfield (defunct) – Medellin, Cebu
 RPVO (OMC) – Ormoc Airport – Ormoc
 RPVP (PPS) – Puerto Princesa International Airport – Puerto Princesa
 RPVQ – Biliran Airport – Naval, Biliran
 RPVR (RXS) – Roxas Airport – Roxas, Capiz
 RPVS (EUQ) – Antique Airport (Evelio Javier/San Jose Airport) – San Jose de Buenavista, Antique
 RPVT (TAG) – Tagbilaran Airport (defunct) – Tagbilaran, Bohol
 RPVU (TBH) – Tugdan Airport – Alcantara, Romblon
 RPVV (USU) – Busuanga–Coron Airport (Francisco B. Reyes Airport) – Coron, Palawan
 RPVW – Borongan Airport – Borongan, Eastern Samar
 RPVX – Dolores Airport (Picardo Airport) (defunct) – Dolores, Eastern Samar
 RPVY – Catbalogan Airport – Catbalogan, Samar
 RPVZ – Siquijor Airport – Siquijor, Siquijor
 RPXX – used for civilian airports and airstrips with no ICAO code yet
 RPZZ – used for military airports and airstrips with no ICAO code yet

TEMPORARY CODES:

NOTE: A number of temporary ICAO codes (with the last two characters being numbers instead of letters) have also been assigned to several notable airports.
 RP10 (LAC) – Swallow Reef (Layang-Layang) Airport – currently administered as part of the Malaysian state of Sabah, but claimed by the Philippines as part of the North Borneo dispute
 RP12 – Pagbilao Grande Airport – Pagbilao, Quezon
 RP13 – Nonoc Airport – Surigao City, Surigao del Norte
 RP14 – MRMP Airport – Ramon, Isabela
 RP15 – PASAR-LIDE Airport – Isabel, Leyte
 RP16 – Menzi Airfield (Cabunbata Airfield/Seahawk Landing Zone) – Isabela, Basilan
 RP17 – Malita Airport – Malita, Davao Occidental

UNOFFICIAL CODES:
 RPEN (ENI) – El Nido Airport – El Nido, Palawan
 RPPN – Rancudo Airfield (military) – Kalayaan, Palawan
 RPTP – Tarumpitao Point Airport (military) – Rizal, Palawan

OBSOLETE CODES:
 RP02 – Laguindingan Airport (now RPMY)
 RP0A – Pinamalayan Airport (reassigned RP11; now RPLA)
 RP0B – Pagbilao Grande Airport (now RP12)
 RP0C – Nonoc Airport (now RP13)
 RP0D – Magat River Multipurpose Project Airport (now RP14)
 RP0E – PASAR-LIDE Airport (now RP15)
 RP0F – Menzi (Cabunbata) Airfield/Seahawk Landing Zone (now RP16)
 RP0G – Malita Airport (now RP17)
 RP11 – Pinamalayan Airport (now RPLA)
 RPAF – Nichols Field/Villamor Air Base (now part of RPLL – Ninoy Aquino International Airport)
 RPBY – Ubay Airport (now RPSN)
 RPCA – Catbalogan Airport (now RPVY)
 RPCU – Cuyo Airport (now RPLO)
 RPNA – Biliran Airport (now RPVQ)
 RPPA – Palanan Airport (now RPLN)
 RPSI – Siargao Airport (now RPNS)
 RPSQ – Siquijor Airport (now RPVZ)
 RPWA – Alah Valley Airport (now RPMA)
 RPWB – Rajah Buayan Air Base (now RPMB)
 RPWC – Cotabato Airport (now RPMC)
 RPWD – Francisco Bangoy International Airport (now RPMD)
 RPWE – Butuan Airport (now RPME)
 RPWG – Dipolog Airport (now RPMG)
 RPWI – Ozamiz Airport (now RPMO)
 RPWJ – Jolo Airport (now RPMJ)
 RPWK – Kenram Airport (now RPMK)
 RPWL – Lumbia Air Base (now RPML)
 RPWM – Malabang Airport (now RPMM)
 RPWN – Tawi-Tawi Airport (now RPMN)
 RPWP – Pagadian Airport (now RPMP)
 RPWS – Surigao Airport (now RPMS)
 RPWT – Del Monte Plantation Airstrip (now RPMT)
 RPWV – Buenavista Airfield – Buenavista, Agusan del Norte
 RPWW – Tandag Airport (now RPMW)
 RPWX – Iligan Airport (now RPMI)
 RPWY – Malaybalay Airport (known as RPMY until 2013)
 RPWZ – Bislig Airport (now RPMF)
 RPXC – Crow Valley Gunnery Range (now RPLQ)
 RPXI – Itbayat Airport (now RPLT)
 RPXJ – Jomalig Airport (now RPLJ)
 RPXG – Lubang Airport (now RPLU)
 RPXM – Fort Magsaysay Airfield (now RPLV)
 RPXP – Wallace Air Station (Poro Point) (now RPLW)
 RPXR – Kindley Landing Field (Corregidor) (now RPLX)
 RPXT – Alabat Airport (now RPLY)
 RPXU – Sorsogon Airport (now RPLZ)

References

 
  – includes IATA codes
 Aviation Safety Network – IATA and ICAO airport codes

R
Airports by ICAO code
Airports by ICAO code
Airports by ICAO code
Airports by ICAO code